Wojciech Wilczyński (born March 18, 1990) is a Polish professional footballer who plays as a defender for III liga club Cartusia Kartuzy.

References

External links
 
 

1990 births
Living people
Polish footballers
Association football defenders
Sportspeople from Słupsk
Poland youth international footballers
Arka Gdynia players
Polonia Bytom players
Sandecja Nowy Sącz players
Warta Poznań players
Bytovia Bytów players
Cartusia Kartuzy players
Ekstraklasa players
I liga players
II liga players
III liga players